L'arcano incantatore, internationally released as The Mysterious Enchanter and Arcane Sorcerer, is a 1996 Italian horror film directed by Pupi Avati and set in the 18th century.

Plot 
1750. The seminarian Giacomo Vigetti is forced to leave Bologna to avoid conviction, after having impregnated a girl and inducing her to have an abortion. The young man, looking for a place to take refuge, is directed to a villa, where he meets an old lady who, hidden behind a fresco, takes an oath of blood with him, having the sackcloth of Giacomo's mother delivered as a pledge, with the promise that will be returned to him once the task entrusted to him has been completed.

On the indication of the mysterious lady, the boy takes refuge in Medelana, in the Bolognese Apennines, to perform the function of secretary in the service of an enigmatic character, a monsignor removed from the Church for his studies on the occult that earned him the title of "arcane spellcaster" ("mysterious enchanter" in some translations). The latter lives alone in an isolated house, surrounded by the volumes of a gigantic library, and Giacomo must replace Nerio, his previous assistant, who died in unclear circumstances and about who ambiguous rumors circulated. The monsignor makes the young man participate in esoteric experiments, and from time to time instructs him to transcribe the encrypted codes dictated by him, which must then be sent to an unknown recipient. The two make a kind of friendship, and the boy quickly convinces himself that in the telepathic and magical searches of his master there is nothing sinister.

Some time later, there is a rumor in the town that Nerio is returning to life. Giacomo learns about it and communicates it to the elderly, who does not give it weight, and also urges him not to believe the malicious rumors about his old helper. One night Giacomo exhumed Nerio's body and brought it to the parish priest of the town; here he discovers with amazement that the corpse is that of the monsignor.

Giacomo thus realizes that the arcane enchanter is actually Nerio and has a scuffle with him, after which he runs away. But, finally going to recover the pledge made for the oath, he will make a bitter discovery.

Recognition 
Pupi Avati was awarded a Silver Crow in the Brussels International Fantastic Film Festival of 1998 for the film.

Cast 
Stefano Dionisi: Giacomo Vigetti
Carlo Cecchi: Nerio 
Arnaldo Ninchi: Aoledo
Andrea Scorzoni: Don Zanini
Mario Erpichini: Father Tommaso
Vittorio Duse: Medelana's parson
Patrizia Sacchi: Vielma
Eliana Miglio: prostitute

References

External links

1996 films
1996 horror films
Italian horror films
Films directed by Pupi Avati
Films set in the 18th century
Films scored by Pino Donaggio
Gothic horror films
1990s Italian films